The 8th is a 2020 documentary film about the campaign to repeal the Thirty-sixth Amendment of the Constitution of Ireland, which gave equal rights to the lives of a pregnant woman and her unborn child. Consequently, the repeal of this amendment repealed the ban on abortion.

Reception
On Rotten Tomatoes, the film holds an approval rating of 100% based on 14 reviews, with an average rating of 8.40/10.

References

External links

Irish documentary films
2020 films
2020 documentary films
English-language Irish films
2020s English-language films